Caryll is both a given name and a surname.

Given name
 Caryll Houselander (1901–1954), woodcarver and ecclesiastical artist
 Caryll Molyneux, 3rd Viscount Molyneux (1624–1699), English army officer

Surname
Billy Caryll of Billy Caryll and Hilda Mundy (1892–1953), British husband-and-wife comedy duo
John Caryll (senior) (1625–1711), English Baron
John Caryll the younger (1667–1736), English Baron
John Baptist Caryll (1713–1788), English Baron
 Ivan Caryll (1861–1921), Belgian composer

See also
 Caral
 Carel
 Carell
 Caril
 Carol (disambiguation)
 Caroll
 Caryl